Anthony Russell Hale (born September 30, 1970) is an American actor and comedian. He is known for his role in the Fox comedy series Arrested Development as Buster Bluth. Hale played Gary Walsh on the HBO comedy Veep from 2012 until its conclusion in 2019, for which he won the 2013 and 2015 Primetime Emmy Award for Outstanding Supporting Actor in a Comedy Series. 

Hale has appeared in feature films including The Informant! (2009), In My Sleep (2010), The Heat (2013), Alvin and the Chipmunks: The Road Chip (2015) and Clifford the Big Red Dog (2021). He has provided voice-work for The Tale of Despereaux (2008), The Angry Birds Movie (2016), The Angry Birds Movie 2 and Toy Story 4 (both 2019) as Forky, a role he reprised in Forky Asks a Question. Hale also created and voiced Archibald in Netflix and Peacock's original series Archibald's Next Big Thing. Hale also voiced Vaneé from Lego Star Wars: Terrifying Tales. He plays twin brothers in the Disney+ original The Mysterious Benedict Society (2021).

Early life
Hale was born in West Point, New York. His mother, Rita ( Garnett), worked as a staff assistant to State Representative Kathy Ashe, and his father, Mike Hale, taught nuclear and atomic physics and served in the military. Hale grew up in Tallahassee, Florida where he attended the Young Actors Theatre and participated in numerous theatrical and musical productions. He graduated from Leon High School in 1988. He graduated from Samford University in Birmingham, Alabama with a journalism degree in 1992. He became a member of Sigma Chi while at the university. He completed graduate studies in 1995 from the School of Communication and the Arts of Regent University in Virginia. After graduating, he lived in New York City for eight years. While in New York, Hale helped found The Haven, an artistically minded community of Christians that meets weekly. He also studied acting at The Barrow Group, as well as at the William Esper Studio in the Professional Actor Training Program.

Career

Hale first obtained his Screen Actors Guild card when he appeared in a commercial for MCI Inc., though it never aired. He made minor guest appearances in TV shows such as Dawson's Creek, The Sopranos, and Sex and the City. From 2003 to 2006, and also in 2013, 2018, and 2019, Hale found success in television cast as Buster Bluth, the hapless, neurotic son with "mother issues" on Arrested Development. Hale also appeared in a season ten episode of MADtv in a parody of COPS, where two British robbers try to stop a domestic dispute among the royal family.

In March 2006, Hale was cast in a co-starring role as the video store owner Simon in the NBC sitcom Andy Barker, P.I., starring Andy Richter and co-created by Conan O'Brien. He appeared in minor roles in Stranger Than Fiction and Because I Said So. He was the voice of Furlough in The Tale of Despereaux, an animated children's film released in 2008. Hale had a recurring role as Emmett on Chuck, beginning in October 2008 and ending in January 2010. His departure made room for his starring role on the NBC web series Ctrl, which premiered on July 13, 2009. He appeared in a cameo in the second episode of the first season of Showtime's dramedy United States of Tara, as English teacher Oral Gershenoff. He joined the cast of Numbers in 2009, in the recurring role of Professor Russell Lazlo.

In 2012, Hale starred in the drama comedy Not That Funny. He also guest-starred on NBC's long-running show Law & Order: SVU as Rick Simms, a teacher who is fired from his job after being accused of inappropriate behavior with a student.

In 2012, Hale was cast in the HBO comedy Veep as Gary Walsh, the personal assistant to Vice President-turned-President Selina Meyer (portrayed by Julia Louis-Dreyfus). On September 22, 2013, Hale won a Primetime Emmy Award for Outstanding Supporting Actor in a Comedy Series for his work in the show's second season. This was his first major award. He earned his second nomination in 2014, but lost the award to Ty Burrell. However Hale won his second Primetime Emmy Award with his third nomination in 2015, in the same ceremony where Veep won its first Primetime Emmy Award for Outstanding Comedy Series.

In 2017, Hale hosted the 9th Annual Shorty Awards at the PlayStation Theater in New York City. In 2018, Hale played the role of Jerome Squalor on the second season of the Netflix comedy drama series A Series of Unfortunate Events, appearing in episodes adapting The Ersatz Elevator and The Penultimate Peril. He appeared in two more episodes of the series.

Personal life
Hale married Emmy Award-winning makeup artist Martel Thompson on May 24, 2003. They have a daughter. Hale and his wife are practicing Christians.

Filmography

Film

Television

Music videos

Awards and nominations
Primetime Emmy Awards

Screen Actors Guild Awards

Critics' Choice Television Awards

Annie Awards

San Diego International Film Festival

References

External links

 
 Tony Hale at Rotten Tomatoes
 The Haven on Facebook
 The Haven - website

Interviews
 2006 Video Interview  at About.com
 Interview with Tony Hale at burnsidewriters.com
 

1970 births
Living people
20th-century American male actors
21st-century American male actors
American Christians
American male film actors
American male television actors
American male voice actors
Leon High School alumni
Male actors from New York (state)
Male actors from Tallahassee, Florida
Outstanding Performance by a Supporting Actor in a Comedy Series Primetime Emmy Award winners
People from West Point, New York
Regent University alumni
Samford University alumni